Murlidhar Chandrakant Bhandare (born 10 December 1928 in Mumbai) is an Indian politician. He was a senior Indian National Congress leader from Maharashtra and a former Rajya Sabha member for three terms during 1980–1982, 1982–1988 and 1988–1994. He practices as Senior Advocate of Supreme Court of India and was President of Supreme Court Bar Association for two terms. Appointed Governor of Odisha on 19 August 2007, he was sworn in on 21 August 2007. On 9 June 2008, he marked the 2nd National Daughters Day of India (Nandini Diwas). He continued in the office until the appointment of S. C. Jamir on 9 March 2013.

References

External links

 news article on being appointed as Governor of Orissa

1928 births
Living people
Indian National Congress politicians
Marathi politicians
Rajya Sabha members from Maharashtra
Governors of Odisha